Niankorodougou  is a department or commune of Léraba Province in south-western  Burkina Faso. Its capital is the town of Niankorodougou. According to the 2019 census the department has a total population of 51,576.

Towns and villages

 Niankorodougou	(3,707 inhabitants) (capital)
 Bassoungoro	(1,182 inhabitants)
 Bavigué-Ka	(1,530 inhabitants)
 Blesso	(415 inhabitants)
 Bozogo	(2,755 inhabitants)
 Djondougou	(1,232 inhabitants)
 Fourkoura	(2,737 inhabitants)
 Kagbogora	(1,829 inhabitants)
 Katolo	(1,420 inhabitants)
 Kawolo	(3,809 inhabitants)
 Nadjengoala	(2,213 inhabitants)
 Naguélédougou	(988 inhabitants)
 Nerfindougou	(2,096 inhabitants)
 Salentene	(929 inhabitants)
 Tagouassoni	(1,564 inhabitants)
 Zegnedougou	(3,203 inhabitants)

References

Departments of Burkina Faso
Léraba Province